Animal Justice Party of Finland is a political party in Finland founded in 2015 and admitted to the registry of political parties in 2016. The party's chairman is Jaakko Perttunen. The party participated the municipal elections in 2017.

Electoral performance

Parliamentary elections

Municipal elections

References

External links

 The Manifest (2016) at Finnish Social Science Data Archive

2015 establishments in Finland
Animal advocacy parties
Registered political parties in Finland